Stenops is a genus of African flowering plants in the daisy family.

 Species
 Stenops helodes B.Nord. 
 Stenops zairensis (Lisowski) B.Nord.

References

Senecioneae
Asteraceae genera
Flora of Africa